The Ven. Walter Thomas  was a Church of Ireland priest in the first half of the 18th century.

Biography 
Walter Thomas was born in Athlone and educated at Trinity College there. He was Archdeacon of Killaloe from 1714 to 1715. He may be the same Walter Thomas who was Precentor of Cashel from 1715 to 1720; then Treasurer of Cashel from 1721 until his resignation on 16 April 1737, and for many years Rector of Thurles. His son George was Treasurer of Cashel from 1737 to 1768.

He also involved himself with the political, social, and religious issues of his time. On 18 September 1727 he informed William Smyth that John Allen was going to vote for Robert French and John King, and thus get over his engagement to Lowther. The same year, he opposed Benjamin Holme at a Quakers Meeting held in Thurles.

He died in June 1743.

Citations

Sources
 
 
 
 

17th-century births
1743 deaths

Year of birth unknown
Archdeacons of Killaloe
18th-century Irish Anglican priests
Alumni of Trinity College Dublin
People from Athlone